Lanfert is a locality in the municipality Schmallenberg in the district Hochsauerlandkreis in North Rhine-Westphalia, Germany.

The hamlet has 6 inhabitants and lies in the northeast of the municipality of Schmallenberg at a height of around 505 m. Rellmecke borders on the villages of Bödefeld and Walbecke. The river Valme flows through the hamlet.

References

Villages in North Rhine-Westphalia
Schmallenberg